The Four Deuces is a 1975 American comedy film directed by William H. Bushnell and written by C. Lester Franklin. The film stars Jack Palance, Carol Lynley, Warren Berlinger, Adam Roarke, Gianni Russo and Hard Boiled Haggerty. The film was released in January 1976, by Embassy Pictures.

Plot
Gangster Vic Morano (Palance) owns the speakeasy nightclub The Four Deuces, and is embroiled in an ongoing gang war with rival mob boss and nightclub owner Chico Hamilton (Berlinger) during the 1930s Prohibition era.

Cast

References

External links
 
 
 
 

1975 films
1970s crime comedy films
American crime comedy films
Films set in the 1930s
Embassy Pictures films
American action adventure films
American comedy-drama films
1975 comedy films
Films produced by Yoram Globus
American gangster films
1970s English-language films
1970s American films